Aframomum pseudostipulare is a species of plant in the ginger family, Zingiberaceae. It was first described by Ludwig Eduard Loesener, Gottfried Wilhelm Johannes Mildbraed, and Jean Koechlin.

References 

pseudostipulare